The Women's 10 metre air pistol competition at the 2015 European Games in Baku, Azerbaijan was held on 17 June at the Baku Shooting Centre.

Schedule
All times are local (UTC+5).

Records

Results

Qualification

Final

References

External links

Women's 10 metre air pistol
Euro